104.7 Radyo de Oro (DXWH 104.7 MHz) is an FM station owned by Manila Broadcasting Company and operated by AJT Production and Media Services. Its studios and transmitter are located at Rooftop Junora Bldg., Purok 7, Brgy. Poblacion, Nabunturan.

References

External links
Radyo de Oro FB Page

Radio stations in Davao de Oro
Radio stations established in 2018